Kakeya may refer to:
Kakeya, Shimane town
S. Kakeya, mathematician
Kakeya set in mathematics